The 1972 Hardie-Ferodo 500 was an endurance motor race open to Group E Series Production Touring Cars. The race was held on 1 October 1972 at the Mount Panorama Circuit just outside Bathurst in New South Wales, Australia. Cars competed in four classes defined by Capacity Price Units, where the engine capacity, expressed in litres (to three decimal places), was multiplied by the purchase price in Australian dollars to arrive at a CP value for each vehicle. It was the 13th running of the Bathurst 500 race and the last to be held over the original distance of 500 miles. It was also the last to allow drivers to compete for the full distance without a relief driver. The race was the third round of the 1972 Australian Manufacturers' Championship.

1972 marked the first year in which rain had significantly affected the race. It was won by Peter Brock driving a Holden Dealer Team prepared Holden Torana, the first of Brock's record nine victories. Brock finished a lap ahead of Queensland racer John French driving a Ford XY Falcon GT-HO Phase III, this despite Brock being penalised one minute at his last pit stop for starting his car while the HDT crew were still re-fueling (under the ARDC's race regulations of the day, car engines had to be switched off during pit stops and could only be restarted once the re-fueling had been completed). A further lap behind was the Chrysler Valiant Charger of Doug Chivas. It was the only time the big three manufacturers of Australia in the 1960s and 1970s all had representatives in the first three outright positions in the race.

Pole sitter and winner of the previous two Bathurst 500's, Allan Moffat, had a trying race. After contesting the lead with Brock in the early laps, Moffat spun his factory entered Ford Falcon at Sulman Park on top of The Mountain in the wet conditions. Although he would fight his way back, he would twice be penalised one minute for restarting his car during pit stops before the re-fueling had been completed. Later in the race the Falcon would also encounter brake problems and Moffat dropped back to finish the race in 9th place, 8 laps down on Brock.

1969 Hardie-Ferodo 500 winner Colin Bond's race ended early when he rolled his Holden Dealer Team Holden Torana on lap 3 while in fourth place. 1967 winner Fred Gibson also rolled his Works GTHO Falcon at McPhillamy Park in the early wet conditions after being forced offline when lapping a slower car. The Falcon spun into the bank and rolled onto its roof on lap 22.

Class structure

Class A
The class for cars under 3000 CP units was contested by Chrysler Valiant Galant, Datsun 1200, Fiat 850 and Mazda 1300.

Class B
The 3001 to 9000 CP units class saw a mix of Datsun 1600, Fiat 124 Sport, Ford Escort, 2.8 litre Holden Torana and Mazda RX-2.

Class C
The 9001 to 18000 CP units class featured Alfa Romeo 1750 GTV, E38 version of the Chrysler Valiant Charger and 3.3 litre Holden Torana GTR XU-1.

Class D
For cars over 18001 CP units, the class consisted only of E49 version of the Chrysler Valiant Charger and Ford Falcon GT-HO.

Top 10 Qualifiers

Results
Results sourced in part from:

Statistics
 Pole Position - #1 Allan Moffat - 2:35.8
 Fastest Lap - #1 Allan Moffat - 2:36.5 (lap record)
 Average Speed - 133 km/h
 Race time of winning car - 6:01:53 (including one minute penalty) 
 One minute penalties were applied to #28 Peter Brock (starting car while refueling), #3 Murray Carter and #53 Bassingthwaite/Hanger (push starts)
 Two one minute penalties were applied to both #1 Allan Moffat (starting car while refueling) and #2 Leo Geoghegan (push starts)

References

External links
 CAMS Manual reference to Australian titles
 Race results at www.uniquecarsandparts.com.au
 1972 Hardie-Ferodo 500 images at www.autopics.com.au
 1972 Official Programme (including Entry List) at www.uniquecarsandparts.com.au
 1973 Official Programme (including 1972 Results) at www.uniquecarsandparts.com.au

Motorsport in Bathurst, New South Wales
Hardie-Ferodo 500